A subshrub (Latin suffrutex) or dwarf shrub is a short shrub, and is a woody plant. Prostrate shrub is a related term. "Subshrub" is often used interchangeably with "bush".

Because the criteria are matters of degree (normally of height) rather than of kind, the definition of a subshrub is not sharply distinguishable from that of a shrub; examples of reasons for describing plants as subshrubs include ground-hugging stems or low growth habit. Subshrubs may be largely herbaceous though still classified as woody, with overwintering perennial woody growth much lower-growing than deciduous summer growth. Some plants described as subshrubs are only weakly woody and some persist for only for a few years; others however, such as Oldenburgia paradoxa live indefinitely (though is still vulnerable to external effects), rooted in rocky cracks.

Small, low shrubs such as lavender, periwinkle, and thyme, and many shrub-like members of the family Ericaceae, such as cranberries and small species of Erica, are often classed as subshrubs.

Definition
The significance of the closeness to the ground is that the buds remain within the soil surface layer and are thus somewhat protected from various adverse external influences. Accordingly, the chamaephyte habit is especially common in stressful environments, for example: 
 ecosystems on nutrient-poor soils or rock
 exposed alpine or arctic ecosystems where seasonal or perennial wind and freezing conditions are prone to kill vulnerable growing shoots
 ecosystems subject to frequent fires and burning, where many species of e.g. Banksia or Eucalyptus regrow from a lignotuber or caudex.  
 heavily grazed or overgrazed ecosystems, such as tortoise turf

Examples of chamaephytes
The term chamaephyte is most formally used within the context of Raunkiær plant life-forms' classification. Examples of chamaephytes are many of the species living in the maquis shrubland and other plants of submediterranean dry ecosystems (species such as thyme, Thymus vulgaris, and rosemary, Salvia rosmarinus); others include heather species (e.g. Calluna vulgaris and Ericas), African wild olive (Olea europaea ssp. cuspidata) and edelweiss (Leontopodium alpinum). Chamaephytes also include cushion plants.

See also
Raunkiær plant life-form
Shrub
Prostrate shrub
Woody plant

References

Plant life-forms
Plant morphology
Mediterranean forests, woodlands, and scrub
Plants by habit